Punjab is the most populous province of Pakistan, and the second-largest by land area. According to the 2017 Census of Pakistan, it had a population of 110 million. This populous province is well known for high quality public and private hospitals that are providing quality services to the people of Punjab. In 2017, there were 88 tehsil-level hospitals (THQ), 34 district hospitals (DHQ), and 23 teaching hospitals in Punjab, Pakistan.

A list of hospitals in major cities of Punjab, Pakistan is given below.

Lahore 
Lahore is the most popular city in Punjab, Pakistan. It has both public and private hospitals that are facilitating a large number of people from different areas of Pakistan. The list of hospitals in Lahore, Pakistan includes the following hospital:

 Doctors Hospital
 Hameed Latif Hospital
 Ittefaq Hospital (Trust)
 National Hospital & Medical Center
 Punjab Institute of Cardiology
 Services Institute of Medical Sciences
 Sharif Medical City Hospital
 Shaukat Khanum Memorial Cancer Hospital & Research Centre
 Surgimed Hospital

Faisalabad 
Faisalabad aka Lyallpur has the following hospitals.
 Al Noor Hospital
 DHQ Hospital
 Allied Hospital
 F.I.C Hospital
 Punjab Institute of Nuclear Medicine PINUM
 Prime Care Hospital
 Punjab Social Security Hospital
 St. Raphael's Hospital

Gujranwala 
Gujranwala aka City of Wrestlers have both public and private hospitals. The list of hospitals in Gujranwala district, contains following hospitals.
 Bhatti Hospital, Gujranwala
 Central Hospital, Gujranwala
 Chaudary Hospital, Gujranwala
 Citi Medicare Hospital, Gujranwala
 Chathah Hospital, Gujranwala
 DHQ Teaching Hospital, Gujranwala
 Combined Military Hospital, Gujranwala
 GINUM Cancer Hospital, Gujranwala
 Gondal Hospital, Gujranwala
 Medcare Hospital, Gujranwala
 Siddique Sadiq Hospital, Gujranwala
 Social Security Hospital, Gujranwala
 Taiba hospital, Gujranwala
 THQ Hospital, Kamonki
 THQ Hospital, Nowshehra Virkan
 THQ Hospital, Wazirabad
 Tuberculosis Hospital, Gujranwala
 Wapda Hospital, Gujranwala
 Wazirabad Cardiology Institute, Wazirabad

Gujrat 
Gujrat District contains the following hospitals.
 Army Burn Centre, Kharian
 Aziz Bhatti Shaheed DHQ Teaching Hospital Gujrat
 Civil Hospital, Jalalpure Jattan 
 Combined Military Hospital, Kharian
 THQ Hospital, Kharian
 THQ Hospital, Sarai Aalamgir

Hafizabad 
The list of hospitals in Hafizabad District is following.
 DHQ Hospital, Hafizabad

Jhang 
Jhang District contains the following hospitals
 DHQ Hospital, Jhang
 Ali Ahmad Khan Hospital, Jhang

Jhelum 
Hospitals operating in Jhelum District are following.
 DHQ Hospital, Jhelum
 Combined Military Hospital Jhelum
 Fauji Foundation Hospital, Jhelum
 THQ Hospital, Pind Dadan Khan
 THQ Hospital, Sohawa

Kasur 
Kasur District contains the following hospitals.
 DHQ Hospital, Kasur

Khanewal 
The list of hospitals in Khanewal District is following.
 DHQ Hospital, Khanewal

Khushab 
Hospitals operating in Khushab District are following
 DHQ Hospital, Khushab

Layyah 
Layyah District contains the following hospitals.
 DHQ Hospital, Layyah

Lodhran 
Lodhran District has following hospitals.
 DHQ Hospital, Lodhran
 Fatima Medical & Welfare Hospital
 Fatima Medical And Welfare Trust Hospital (Chak No.362/WB), Dunyapur Tehsil

Mandi Bahauddin 
Hospitals operating in Mandi Bahauddin District are following
 DHQ Hospital, Mandi Bahauddin
THQ Hospital, Phalia 
THQ Hospital, Malakwal

Mianwali 
The list of hospitals in Mianwali District is following.
 DHQ Hospital, Mianwali
 THQ Hospital, Isakhel
 THQ Hospital, Piplan
 THQ Hospital, Kalabagh
 Obaid Noor Hospital
 P.A.E.C Hospital, Chashma Barrage
 P.A.F. Hospital, Mianwali

Multan 
City of the Saints, Multan, contains the following hospitals.
 Bakhtawar Amin Memorial Hospital Multan
 Chaudhry Pervaiz Elahi Institute of Cardiology Multan
 City Hospital (Multan)
 Fatima Medical And Welfare Hospital (Chak No.362/WB, Multan Dunyapur Road)
 Govt THQ Hospital Shujabad
 Khawaja Farid Social Security Hospital
 Khursheed Rafiq Hospital
 Nishtar Hospital
 Railway Hospital Multan
 Women's Christian Hospital
 Medi Care

Muzaffargarh 
Muzaffargarh District contains the following hospitals.
 DHQ Hospital, Muzaffargarh
 Recep Tayyip Erdogan Hospital, Muzaffargarh

Attock 
Hospitals in Attock District are following.
 DHQ Hospital, Attock
 THQ hospital Jand
 THQ hospital Fateh Jang
 THQ hospital Pindi Gaib

Bahawalnagar 
Hospitals operating in Bahawalnagar District are following.
 DHQ Hospital, Bahawalnagar

Bahawalpur 
The list of hospitals in Bahawalpur District is following.
 Victoria Hospital, Bahawalpur
 Bino Cancer Hospital, Bahawalpur
 Azlan Shan Bahadur Khan Hospital, Bahawalpur
 Civil Hospital, Bahawalpur
 Zubair Hospital

Bhakkar 
Bhakkar District contains the following hospitals
 DHQ Hospital, Bhakkar

Chakwal 
The list of hospitals in Chakwal District contains the following hospitals
 DHQ Hospital, Chakwal

Chiniot 
Hospitals operating in Chiniot District are following
 DHQ Hospital, Chiniot

Dera Ghazi Khan 
Dera Ghazi Khan District contains the following hospitals.
 DHQ Hospital, Dera Ghazi Khan
 Buzdar General Hospital and Infertility Clinic, Dera Ghazi Khan

Narowal 
Following hospitals are operating in Narowal District.
 DHQ Hospital, Narowal
Sughra Shafi Medical Hospital Complex

Nankana Sahib 
Hospitals in Nankana Sahib District are following.
 DHQ Hospital, Nankana Sahib

Okara 
Okara District contains the following hospitals.
 DHQ Okara
Al Madina Hospital and Maternity Home, Renala Khurd

Pakpattan 
Following hospitals are operating in Pakpattan District.
 DHQ Hospital, Pakpattan

Rahim Yar Khan 
The list of hospitals in Rahim Yar Khan District contains the following hospitals.
 DHQ Hospital, Rahim Yar Khan
 Shaikh Zayed Medical College and Hospital, Rahim Yar Khan

Rajanpur 
Hospitals in Rajanpur District are following.
 DHQ Hospital, Rajanpur

Rawalpindi 
Rawalpindi aka Pindi is the well known city of Pakistan. The list of hospitals in Rawalpindi District contains the following hospitals.
 Abdul Sattar General Hospital
Al-Khidmat Raazi Hospital
 Al Shifa Eye Trust
 Al Shifa Hospital Chakri Road
 Attock Hospital Ltd.
 Benazir Bhutto Hospital
 Bilal Hospital
 Cantt General Hospital
 CB Hospital
 DHQ Hospital, Rawalpindi
 Fouji Foundation Hospital
 Hanif Hospital
 Heart International Hospital
 Holy Family Hospital
 Jinnah International Hospital
 Madina Medical Centre
 Maryam Memorial Hospital Bahria Town Phase 4
 Mehboob Hospital
 Medixo Aesthetic Clinic
 Nusrat Hospital
 Railway General Hospital
 Rawalpindi General Hospital
 Rawalpindi Institute of Cardiology
 Shafi International Hospital
 St Joseph’s Hospice, Rawalpindi

Sahiwal 
Sahiwal District contains the following hospitals.
 DHQ Hospital, Sahiwal

Sheikhupura 
The list of hospitals in Sheikhupura District is following.
 Farooq Poly Clinic
 Khan Hospital
 Kishwar Fazal Hospital Sheikhupura
 Sultan Hospital Sheikhupura

Sialkot 
Hospitals in Sialkot District are following.
 DHQ Hospital, Sialkot
 Bethania Hospital, Sialkot

Sargodha 
The list of hospitals in Sargodha contains the following hospitals.
 DHQ Hospital Sargodha

Toba Tek Singh  
Toba Tek Singh District contains the following hospitals.
 DHQ Hospital, Toba Tek Singh

Vehari 
Hospitals in Vehari District are following.
 DHQ Hospital, Vehari

Kot Addu
Kot Addu contains following Hospitals:
 THQ Hospital Kot Addu

See also
 List of hospitals in Pakistan

References